St Helen's Chapel is an Eastern Orthodox church in Colchester, Essex, under the jurisdiction of the Antiochian Orthodox Christian Archdiocese of the British Isles and Ireland, headed by Metropolitan Silouan Oner.

Liturgy  
Divine Liturgy at Saint Helen's Chapel is prayed in the English language, despite Arabic serving as the official language of the Greek Orthodox Patriarchate of Antioch and All the East. Divine Liturgy is prayed at 10:30 am on Sundays, with occasional services during the week.

History 
In the 16th century, after the Protestant Reformation, St Helen's Chapel ceased to be used for worship and instead was used for secular use as a school, library, and workshop. In the 18th century, the chapel began to be used as a Quaker meeting house and later a Church Hall. In 1886, the Round family, who also owned Colchester Castle, purchased the chapel, and hired famous architect William Butterfield to restore it. Very little of the original stonework exists, excluding a few decorative Roman bricks.

Since the 24th of February 1950, the chapel has been Grade II listed on the National Heritage List for England.

In 2000, after 500 years, the chapel was restored by the local Eastern Orthodox parish to be used for Divine Liturgy.

References 

Greek Orthodox Church of Antioch
Church buildings converted to a different denomination
Greek Orthodox churches in the United Kingdom
Former Church of England church buildings